Catti-brie (spelled in later publications as "Cattie-brie") is a fictional character in the Forgotten Realms setting, based on the Dungeons & Dragons role-playing game. The creation of American author R.A. Salvatore, she is primarily known as the love interest of the drow ranger Drizzt Do'Urden and has appeared in multiple media alongside Drizzt.

Development
R.A. Salvatore named Catti-brie after his daughter Caitlin Brielle after the editor suggested The Crystal Shard needed a strong female character. Salvatore ended the 1996 novel Passage to Dawn with "Drizzt and Catti-brie riding off into the sunset" as he had envisioned it to be his final book about Drizzt and his companions after falling out with his then-publisher, TSR, Inc. On the decision to kill off Catti-brie as a direct consequence of the Spellplague event in the Transitions trilogy, which begins with 2007’s The Orc King and concludes in 2009’s The Ghost King, Salvatore explained that Dungeons & Dragons publisher Wizards of the Coast had issued the mandate to advance the timeline of the Forgotten Realms by 100 years. Salvatore suggested that his "hand was forced” as the time jump conflicts with Catti-brie's natural human lifespan; although he had made plans to take the character in an "interesting direction", Salvatore concluded that being forced into an uncomfortable space had prompted him to become more creative with his writing in response to the revised setting. Salvatore drew from his personal experiences in his approach to portray the ignominious deaths of Catti-brie and her halfling friend Regis.

Salvatore later found a way to bring Catti-brie back into the story canon along with Drizzt's other companions. He recalled feeling nervous about potential negative fan reception, but felt that he had a sensible and justifiable reason for his approach, and thought he could "make a point". Salvatore emphasized that many readers are emotionally attached to Drizzt and his companions after following the stories he wrote about them for several years.

Fictional biography 
Catti-brie is a beautiful auburn-haired and blue-eyed woman with a kind, tolerant, and pragmatic personality. Catti-brie is one of the Companions of the Hall, and often serves as the emotional compass for her adventuring companions, guiding both Drizzt and Wulfgar into wise action with her common sense and clear insight. Catti-brie is the first person in the Icewind Dale to accept Drizzt, although she was very young when Drizzt came to know her. 

Catti-brie's mother died in childbirth, and her father moved with his daughter from Mirabar to Termalaine, one of the Ten Towns. For three years, he was quite successful -- but then a goblin ended the man's life. All of Termalaine might have fallen to a goblin onslaught but for the dwarves of clan Battlehammer rushing from their valley to turn back the horde. Bruenor himself saved the orphan girl from death. When the smoke cleared, he claimed Catti-brie as his adopted daughter. Catti-brie has no memories of the time before Bruenor took her in, but she had a pleasant childhood with the dwarves. As a result of her upbringing, Catti-brie possesses a stubborn and tough dwarf personality akin to her foster-father. 

During the five years Wulfgar spent in Bruenor's service, Catti-brie helped him to break the bonds of his barbarian upbringing and bring out the compassion and intelligence that was inside him. The bond between the two of them continued to grow stronger as they adventured together with Bruenor, Regis, and Drizzt Do'Urden, and, at one time, they were betrothed. Tragedy struck their relationship when a drow seeking the death of Drizzt attacked Mithral Hall, and Wulfgar was captured by Errtu during one of the battles. She would then have a tentative, on-off romance with Drizzt through many of the books which culminates in The Two Swords. 

When Regis was being chased by Artemis Entreri, Catti-brie was held prisoner by the assassin.  After the finding of Mithral Hall she discovered Taulmaril the Heartseeker, Gift of Anariel, Sister of Faerûn, in the destroyed Hall of Dumathoin. For several years she also carried the sentient blade Khazid'hea otherwise known as "Cutter", the sword that she took from the body of Dantrag Baenre, after defeat and death at the hands of Drizzt.

Shortly after beginning her training as a Wizard, Catti-brie was struck by a falling strand of the Weave during the Spellplague. Catti-brie's body remained on the material plane, though her mind and spirit is pulled into the plane of existence known as Shadowfell. Her patron goddess Mielikki eventually retrieved her spirit but she could not be returned to the world of the living in her state, instead remaining in a pocket dimension created by Mielikki. In the 2013 book The Companions, it is revealed that Mielikki offered Catti-brie the choice of being reincarnated as a mortal newborn of the same race and sex as her first mortal form. She reemerges as a Bedine tribeswoman named Ruqiah who is born in 1463 DR, long after the original Catti-brie died in 1385 DR.

Weapons
In combat, Catti-brie usually supported her friends with Taulmaril and her limitless supply of arrows. She was not hesitant about entering melee, however, and would charge into combat with Khazid'hea at the ready, generally confident in her ability to dominate the blade.  However, she was recently wounded by a giant-thrown boulder during the defense of Mithril Hall from the legions of Obould Many-Arrows.  This lasting injury has forced her to largely forgo the use of traditional melee weaponry, being physically unable to fight as she once did.  To compensate, she studies magic under the tutelage of the wizard Alustriel Silverhand.

Taulmaril the Heartseeker

Taulmaril was a gift to the Mithral Hall dwarves by Lady Anariel, Sister of Faerûn. The bow is made of wood enspelled not to break or scratch, and the quiver held 20 silver arrows (which can magically teleport back to the quiver); when one was used the quiver magically replaced it. The bow was used by Catti-brie. Part of the weapon's enchantment (passed to the arrows when they're fired by it) is that the arrows are imbued with crackling energy in flight that causes them to deal far more damage than would be typical for a normal arrow. The energy is probably electrical in nature, as it scorches targets, can set flammables alight, but does not seem to have any particularly enhanced effect upon cold-based creatures.

Another property of Taulmaril the Heartseeker is that the arrow, when fired from the bow, travels at super high speeds compared to a normal bow, allowing it to blast through enemies even when they have armor.

Khazid'hea (Cutter)

Khazid'hea was the evil sentient blade she wielded during The Legacy period, the blade with a wicked design all of its own and with the ability to communicate with its user and the ability to change the shape of its own hilt; furthermore the super sharp blade could cut through solid stone. Khazid'hea could easily take over the minds of others in its search to be wielded by the dark elf ranger Drizzt Do'Urden, by its measure the greatest fighter in the world.  Catti-brie, however, was able to overcome the sword and put it to deadly use, though soon after this Khazid'hea left the hands of Catti-brie and after some time led to the death of Delly Curtie, Wulfgar's wife, and after that fell into the hands of another drow elf.  Khazid'hea's ego, it seems, could not stand Catti-brie's use of Taulmaril.

Later in the Legacy of the Drow series, specifically Starless Night, after Drizzt killed Dantrag Baenre his sword, Khazid'hea, came into Catti-brie's hands when Drizzt refused, saying, "I favor the scimitar", because the sword's hilt took the shape of a unicorn's head, the symbol of Mielikki.

The sword's name, Khazid'hea, literally means cutter in the drow language.

The Blade itself is sentient in nature, wishing for only the best to wield it. Or it will take over the mind of the "owner", as evidenced by the use of Delly Curtie, Wulfgar's wife, and subsequently several Orcs, to get to Drizzt Do'Urden in the book The Two Swords.

In other media

 Catti-brie makes a cameo appearance along with the other Companions of the Hall in 2000's Baldur's Gate II. 
 She appears in 2021's Dungeons & Dragons: Dark Alliance as one of the four playable characters.
She appears in the 2021 Magic: The Gathering expansion set Dungeons & Dragons: Adventures in the Forgotten Realms as a "Legendary Creature" card in the Aura Of Courage commander deck.

Reception
In the Io9 series revisiting older Dungeons & Dragons novels, Rob Bricken commented that "The Crystal Shard'''s biggest crime by far is its scarcity of female characters; only one has a name and dialogue. That would be Bruenor’s adopted human daughter Cattie-Brie, who, even though Drizzt calls her his soulmate in chapter one, gets only a few dozen lines", although he noted that "I know for a fact that Salvatore's writing—included his female characters; thankfully, Cattie-Brie even eventually joins Bruenor, Drizzt, and Wulfgar on their adventures in later books—improved over time." In reviewing the sequel, Bricken commented that "this time Cat is a real protagonist and needs a reason to stay part of the story, with as well-rounded a personality and as much development as the other main characters. This is a massive improvement, although her character arc starts out rough. Basically, despite being a very proficient warrior herself, she’s so terrified of the assassin she can't do anything, to the point she occasionally doesn't even need to be tied up. Finally, she gets ahold of herself and starts doing the "sow seeds of distrust among the captors" shtick. However, when she does escape, she becomes a badass equal to the others (well, not Drizzt, only Artemis is on par with Drizzt). She manages to trap the golem under a rock pile during her flight, catching up with the others right before they enter Mithral Hall for the final act."

Recalling the divisive reception over the death of Wulfgar in earlier instalments of The Legend of Drizzt'' series, Salvatore noted that the response to the deaths of Catti-brie and Regis from fans was more subdued.

References

Fictional archers
Fictional women soldiers and warriors
Forgotten Realms characters
Literary characters introduced in 1988

pl:Catti-brie